The Ettajdid Movement (Movement for Renewal ; ,), also referred to simply as Ettajdid, was a centre-left secularist political party in Tunisia, active from 1993 to 2012.

History and profile
Ettajdid evolved out of the old Tunisian Communist Party when it abandoned its former ideology in 1993. During the Ben Ali rule it was one of the legal, although oppressed opposition parties. After the Tunisian revolution of 2011, it became part of the Democratic Modernist Pole alliance and in 2012 it merged into the Social Democratic Path. It was led by its First Secretary Mohamed Harmel from its creation until 2007 and then by Ahmed Brahim until its dissolution.

Adopting its new name and abandoning communism in April 1993, the party adopted a social economic programme, and it was legalised in November 1993. In the 1994 election, the party won four seats. This increased to five in 1999, before falling to three in the 2004 election and to two in 2009, making it the smallest of the seven parties represented in the Tunisian parliament.

After massive protests in January 2011, Ettajdid gained a post for Ahmed Brahim as Minister of Higher Education. For the Constituent assembly election, Ettajdid formed a strongly secularist alliance called Democratic Modernist Pole (PDM), of which it was the mainstay.

On 1 April 2012, it merged with the Tunisian Labour Party and some individual members of the Democratic Modernist Pole to form the Social Democratic Path.

Ettajdid published Attariq al Jadid (New Path).

Electoral history

Presidential elections

Chamber of Deputies elections

Footnotes

External links
Official website

1993 establishments in Tunisia
2012 disestablishments in Tunisia
Defunct political parties in Tunisia
Political parties established in 1993
Political parties disestablished in 2012
Secularism in Tunisia
Socialist parties in Tunisia